Peristeranthus hillii, commonly known as the beetle orchid or brown fairy-chain orchid is the only species in the genus Peristeranthus from the orchid family, Orchidaceae. It is an epiphytic or lithophytic orchid with more or less pendulous stems, between three and ten widely spaced, leathery leaves and a large number of pale green, often spotted flowers. It mainly grows on tree trunks and thick vines in rainforest and is found between the Bloomfield River in Queensland and Port Macquarie in New South Wales.

Description
The leaves have many parallel veins, a drooping tip and are often twisted. The side lobes are triangular and the middle lobe has a hollow, tapered spur. Flowering occurs from September to October.

Taxonomy and naming
The beetle orchid was first formally described in 1859 by Ferdinand von Mueller who gave it the name Saccolabium hillii and published the description in Fragmenta phytographiae Australiae from a specimen collected by Walter Hill near Moreton Bay.<ref name="F.Muell.">{{cite book |last1=von Mueller |first1=Ferdinand |title=Fragmenta phytographiae Australiae (Volume 1, Part 8) |date=1859 |publisher=Victorian Government Printer |location=Melbourne |page=192 |url=https://www.biodiversitylibrary.org/item/202689#page/216/mode/1up |accessdate=26 December 2018}}</ref> In 1954, Trevor Edgar Hunt changed the name to Peristeranthus hillii. According to Hunt, the name Peristeranthus is derived from the Greek words peristera meaning "dove" and anthus meaning "flower", as "the flower" is "bearing a fanciful resemblance to a dove". In ancient Greek, "flower" is however anthos (ἄνθος). The specific epithet honours the collector of the type specimen.

Distribution and habitatPeristeranthus hillii'' mainly grows on three trunks and vines in highland rainforest in the tropics and in coastal and near-coastal areas in subtropical regions. It is found between the Bloomfield River in Queensland and Port Macquarie in New South Wales.

Conservation
This orchid is listed as vulnerable under the New South Wales Threatened Species Conservation Act 1995. The main threats to the species are habitat loss, storm damage, inappropriate fire regimes and illegal collecting.

See also
 List of Orchidaceae genera

References

Endemic orchids of Australia
Orchids of New South Wales
Orchids of Queensland
Monotypic Epidendroideae genera
Vandeae genera
Aeridinae
Plants described in 1859